Michael Alexander Moser (pronounced MOH-zer; born November 8, 1990) is an American retired professional basketball player. He played college basketball for the University of Oregon as a senior. Moser was an All-American player at the University of Nevada, Las Vegas (UNLV) before transferring to Oregon in 2013.

High school and college career
Moser attended Grant High School in Portland, Oregon, where he led the school to a state title in 2008.  He originally committed to Arizona, but backed out of his commitment once coach Lute Olson resigned, opting for UCLA.

After getting minimal playing time and struggling with the Bruins' style, Moser decided to transfer. Moser landed at UNLV, where he enjoyed a strong sophomore season in 2011–12, averaging 14 points and 10.5 rebounds per game.  Moser was named all-Mountain West Conference and an honorable mention All-American by the Associated Press.  As a junior, Moser suffered a disappointing season as he battled a dislocated elbow suffered early in the season.

Moser graduated from UNLV at the end of the season and sought to transfer to another school for his last year of eligibility.  He ultimately chose the University of Oregon under coach Dana Altman. As a senior in 2013–14, Moser played 34 games, averaging 13.2 points, 7.7 rebounds, 1.6 assists and 1.1 steals in 28.4 minutes per game, going on to earn All-Pac-12 Honorable Mention honors.

Professional career
After going undrafted in the 2014 NBA draft, Moser joined the Boston Celtics for the 2014 NBA Summer League averaging 13.6 points, 4.8 rebounds, and 2 assists in 26.2 minutes per game. On September 1, 2014, he signed with Lietuvos rytas Vilnius of the Lithuanian Basketball League for the 2014–15 season.

On July 24, 2015, Moser signed with Hapoel Holon of the Israeli Basketball Premier League. Moser was originally supposed to join the Phoenix Suns on September 25, 2016, but couldn't do so due to a health issue he had around that time.

In June 2017 he obtained an Albanian passport and went on to play that year with the national team in World Cup pre-qualification.

On July 8, 2017, Moser signed with the Italian team Pallacanestro Reggiana for the 2017–18 season. On August 23, 2017, he parted ways with Reggiana. Moser did not pass the physical examinations.

On August 10, 2018, Moser signed with Karhu Basket from the Finnish Korisliiga.

On December 20, 2018, he signed with LNB Pro A team JL Bourg.

Coaching career

Oregon Ducks women's basketball 
He was hired as assistant coach by Oregon Ducks in 2021 after working with the Dallas Mavericks as player development and analytics from 2019 to 2021.

Boston Celtics 
In July 2022, he was hired by the Boston Celtics as assistant coach-player enhancement staff.

Personal life
Moser married former Olympic gymnast Tasha Schwikert in 2015. They have a daughter, Jayden, born in December 2015.

References

External links
 Oregon Ducks bio
 UNLV Runnin' Rebels bio

1990 births
Living people
Albanian men's basketball players
Albanian people of African-American descent
American expatriate basketball people in Finland
American expatriate basketball people in France
American expatriate basketball people in Israel
American expatriate basketball people in Kosovo
American expatriate basketball people in Lithuania
American expatriate basketball people in Qatar
American men's basketball players
Basketball players from Dallas
BC Rytas players
Grant High School (Portland, Oregon) alumni
Hapoel Holon players
JL Bourg-en-Bresse players
Kauhajoen Karhu players
KB Prishtina players
Naturalized citizens of Albania
Oregon Ducks men's basketball players
Power forwards (basketball)
Basketball players from Portland, Oregon
UCLA Bruins men's basketball players
UNLV Runnin' Rebels basketball players